Pholiota malicola is an inedible species of fungus in the mushroom family Strophariaceae. Originally called Flammula malicola by mycologist Calvin Henry Kauffman in 1926, it was transferred to the genus Pholiota by Alexander H. Smith in 1934. It is found in North America and Australia.

See also
List of Pholiota species

References

Strophariaceae
Fungi described in 1926
Fungi of North America
Fungi of Australia
Inedible fungi